Jimi Shields (born James J. Shields; 1967), is an Irish architect and musician. He was a member of 1990s indie rock group Rollerskate Skinny. He formed the band the Wounded Knees with former Mercury Rev flutist Suzanne Thorpe in 2001. In 2004, with wife and partner, Maria Vlahos, Shields established TTT (thirtythreetrees), a Dublin based landscape architecture and garden design practice.

Personal life
Shields is one of five siblings born to a mother who worked as a nurse and a food-industry executive father. The family immigrated to Dublin when he was a child. My Bloody Valentine leader Kevin Shields is his older brother and shoe designer Eileen Shields is his younger sister. Shields is a graduate of Technological University Dublin – Bolton Street. Shields has three daughters with wife and partner Maria Vlahos.

Musical career
Shields started playing drums as a teenager with lessons from Brian Downey of Thin Lizzy. Shields went on to form Rollerskate Skinny with members of the band Shake in 1991 as guitarist/drummer/vocalist. He played on, co-produced and wrote much of their debut 1993 Shoulder Voices LP, as well as on the Novice (1992), Trophy (1993), and Threshold (1994) EPs. He wrote and recorded a song with Mercury Rev's David Baker for his Shady project in 1994. Shields left Rollerskake Skinny in 1994 and moved from Dublin to Chicago. While in Chicago, he formed Lotus Crown, and released Chokin' on the Jokes on Reprise Records in 1997. In 2002 Shields worked with Martina Topley-Bird as touring drummer and In 2008, with the Wounded Knees, he released the "All Rise" EP on limited-edition 10" brown vinyl featuring J Mascis and played a string of tour dates supporting Dinosaur Jr. Shields later recorded drum sessions with brother Kevin Shields for sampling purposes on My Bloody Valentine's 2013 release mbv.

TTT (thirtythreetrees)
Established in 2004 by Jimi Shields + Maria Vlahos, TTT is a multi-disciplinary design practice, based in Dublin City, with a particular emphasis on landscape architecture and garden design installations. TTT have completed several award winning projects; including awards from the Royal Institute of the Architects of Ireland, the Architectural Association of Ireland and a nomination for the European Union Prize for Contemporary Architecture – Mies van der Rohe Award in 2017. TTT have exhibited at the Venice Biennale of Architecture, in 2010, with dePaor Architects. The practice also undertakes temporary for artwork installations. TTT were awarded the Arts Council Architecture Project Award in 2011 and were awarded the first affiliate memberships to the Irish Landscape Institute in 2009. Jimi Shields, graduate of the Dublin School of Architecture (TU Dublin), has been invited to speak and teach at various universities and events including, UCD School of Architecture, UCD School of Landscape Architecture, Dublin School of Architecture (TU Dublin), Queens University Belfast and UCC School of Architecture, PechaKucha Dublin, the Royal Institute of Architects of Ireland and the Architectural Association of Ireland. Shields has also written for various publications.

References

External links
TTT (thirtythreetrees) Website
Merrion Square
The Wounded Knees' MySpace Profile
AAI Podcast, Jimi Shields interview

Irish guitarists
Irish male guitarists
Irish drummers
Male drummers
1967 births
Living people
Place of birth missing (living people)